Kelsey Renée Bone (born December 31, 1991) is an American professional basketball player who is currently a free agent.

College statistics

Source

USA Basketball
Bone was selected to play in the USA Women's Youth Development Festival. Eligible players are female basketball players who are in their sophomore or junior in high school. The 2007 event took place at the US Olympic Training Center in Colorado Springs, CO.

Bone was a member of the USA Women's U18 team which won the gold medal at the FIBA Americas Championship in Buenos Aires, Argentina. The event was held in July 2008, when the USA team defeated host Argentina to win the championship. Bone helped the team win all five games, starting all five games and scoring over ten points per game.

Bone continued on to the USA Women's U19 team which represented the US in the 2009 U19 World's Championship, held in Bangkok, Thailand in July and August 2009. Although the USA team lost the opening game to Spain, they went on to win their next seven games to earn a rematch against Spain in the finals, and won the game 81–71 to earn the gold medal. Bone started all nine games and was the team's second highest scorer, with 12.3 points per game.

WNBA career statistics

Source

Regular season

|-
| style="text-align:left;"| 2013
| style="text-align:left;"| New York
| style="background-color:#D3D3D3;"|34°||2||19.5||.460||.000||.632||5.4||0.7||0.4||0.4||1.5||6.9
|-
| style="text-align:left;"| 2014
| style="text-align:left;"| Connecticut
|style="background-color:#D3D3D3;"|34°||26||23.3||.451||.000||.662||5.3||1.4||0.6||0.5||2.0||9.3
|-
| style="text-align:left;"| 2015
| style="text-align:left;"| Connecticut
|34||33||28.3||.508||.000||.622||6.1||1.9||0.8||0.6||2.3||15.0
|-
| style="text-align:left;"| 2016
| style="text-align:left;"| Connecticut
|style="background-color:#D3D3D3;"|14° || 13 || 23.9 ||.433||.267||.667||5.4||1.3||0.7||0.2||1.9||10.7
|-
| style="text-align:left;"| 2016
| style="text-align:left;"| Phoenix
|style="background-color:#D3D3D3;"|20° || 0 || 9.7 ||.388||.000||.700||2.5||0.6||0.2||0.1||1.3||3.0
|-
| style="text-align:left;"| 2018
| style="text-align:left;"| Las Vegas
|32||10||10.8||.500||–||.500||2.2||1.2||0.1||0.1||0.9||2.8
|-
|- class="sortbottom"
| style="text-align:center;" colspan="2"| Career
|  168||84||19.6||.470||.167||.634||4.6||1.2||0.5||0.3||1.6||8.1
|}

Playoffs

|-
| style="text-align:left;"| 2016
| style="text-align:left;"| Phoenix
| 2 || 0 || 4.0 || 1.000 ||–||–||0.5||0.0||0.0||0.0||0.0||2.0

Personal life
Bone's younger half-brother, Donovan Williams, plays basketball at UNLV.

References

WNBA Biography

1991 births
Living people
All-American college women's basketball players
American expatriate basketball people in China
American expatriate basketball people in Turkey
American women's basketball players
Basketball players from Houston
Centers (basketball)
Connecticut Sun players
Galatasaray S.K. (women's basketball) players
Las Vegas Aces players
Liaoning Flying Eagles players
McDonald's High School All-Americans
New York Liberty draft picks
New York Liberty players
Parade High School All-Americans (girls' basketball)
Phoenix Mercury players
South Carolina Gamecocks women's basketball players
Texas A&M Aggies women's basketball players
Women's National Basketball Association All-Stars